Russian State Social University (RSSU) was the first public university in the Russian Federation to offer undergraduate and graduate programmes in the field of social work. It is located in Moscow and has three main historically important campuses. Russian State Social University is recognized as a fully accredited, state-owned, traditional institution. The current rector is Andrey Khazin.

History

RSSU was founded in 1991 with the mandate to continue the core of the research and teaching activities of the former Higher School of the Communist Party. Initially, research and teaching were focused on the social and political sciences. Gradually, University activities extended into project work on social policy for State Institutions, as well as the education and support of acting administrators. It also became the leading institution for developing and drafting social reforms.
RSSU was the first University in the Russian Federation to launch educational programs in the areas of Social Work, Social Youth Work, Social Insurance, Social Gerontology and Social Support for the disabled. Since starting these programs, more than 400 000 social workers have graduated from the University.

Historical highlights

1991: Russian State Social Institute was established by an act № 15 of the Government of the Russian Federation.
1991: At one of the most picturesque places in Moscow – Losiny Ostrov National Park, the first campus of Russian State Social Institute was opened.
1994: Russian State Social Institute was renamed to Moscow State Social University. 
1998: Moscow State Social University was granted with the public traditional university status.
1999: Stromynka campus was founded.
2003: University received its most precious and historically unique campus on Wilhelm Pieck Street.
In 2005 Russian State Social University received its current name. 
2005: On the territory of the Russian State Social University campus, with the help of students and academic staff donations, was founded the orthodox church named after the Feodorovskaya Icon of the Mother of God.
2006: Academic staff of Russian State Social University was awarded in the sphere of education by the Government of the Russian Federation.

Faculties

RSSU has 16 faculties which are connected to the variety of scientific fields. 
Faculty of Sociology
Faculty of Information Technologies 
Faculty of Psychology 
Faculty of Art and Cultural Activities 
Faculty of Law 
Faculty of Linguistics 
Faculty of Social Work 
Faculty of Humanities 
Faculty of Economics 
Faculty of Pre-University Training 
Faculty of Management 
Faculty of Further Education 
Faculty of Communication Management 
Faculty of Distance Education 
Faculty of Postgraduate Studies 
Preparatory Faculty for International Students

Among the notable specialties for undergraduate, graduate and doctoral programs could be found: Sociology, Social Work, Youth Outreach Management, Psychology, Conflict Analysis and Resolution, Economics, Management, Human Resources Management, Business Information Systems, Psychology and Pedagogical Studies, Special Education, Linguistics, International Relations etc.

Campuses

RSSU campuses are located in different sides of Moscow, and each of them has a unique history.

Campus on Wilhelm Pieck Street
There is a complex of academic and administrative buildings on Wilhelm Pieck Street, including a library and sports facilities (fitness center, swimming pool, running track etc.).

The current main building of the Russian State Social University passed through a long and interesting history. Starting from the 1920s there was a headquarters of International Academy for the Trade-Union Movement, where were built-up the members of Communist Parties from different countries, where these activities were banned. The Communist International (Comintern) settled in the same building from 1938 till 1943. During that time there were working such important players of the International Movement as Georgi Dimitrov, Dmitri Manuilsky, Moris Torez, Dolores Ibarruri, Klement Gottwald, Palmiro Togliatti, Otto Kuusinen, Walter Ulbricht, and others. From 1943, with the demands of the historical period, in the building was located the Soviet Information Bureau, sort of a fusion between the KGB, the Ministry of Foreign Affairs and the Soviet Counterintelligence. There were prepared a lot of acknowledged operations against Nazi Intelligence Office, data processing etc.
In 1956, the main building on Wilhelm Pieck Street passed to the Higher Party School, which in 1959 was replaced by the Marx-Engels-Lenin Institute, existed there until 1991.
In 2003 it became a part of Russian State Social University campus.

Campus on Stromynka Street

Academic buildings, students admission office, cultural center and a medical center are parts of the territory of the campus on Stromynka Street.

Campuses on Losiny Ostrov National Park

This RSSU campus on Losiny Ostrov National Park is located in one of the most picturesque and ecologically clean areas of Moscow. All sides of the campus are surrounded by the forest. Academic buildings, college, and student dormitories are parts of the campus area.

International relations

Russian State Social University attracts students from all over the world for its educational programs. It receives more than a hundred students participating in the mobility programs annually from Europe, South America, Asia and CIS countries. It has a fruitful history of international cooperation with more than hundred agreements worldwide.
Among the partner universities could be found the followings:

National University of Cuyo
University of Lodz
Pai Chai University
University of Huelva
University of Ostrava
Dalian University of Foreign Languages

Notable alumni

Borodakova, Maria – volleyball player, a member of the national team (2005-2013), world champion (2006, 2010), master of sports of the Russian Federation.
Galushka, Alexander – Minister for the Development of the Russian Far East.
Gamova, Ekaterina – volleyball player of the national team, world champion, master of sports of the Russian Federation. 
Kapranova, Olga – athlete, the world and European champion, master of sports of the Russian Federation.
Karjakin, Sergey – chess player, the youngest grandmaster in history (Guinness Record), master of sports of Ukraine.
Kulikovskaya, Evgenia – tennis player and coach, master of sports of the Russian Federation (1998), the winner of four tournaments WTA (1996).
Lukashov, Denys – professional kickboxer.
Martsinkevich, Maxim - Russian neo-Nazi activist
Metov, Kay – songwriter and composer, honored Artist of Russia (2015);
Moore, Alan – Irish journalist and educator;
Nepomnyashchii, Ian – chess player, European champion (2010), Russian champion (2010).
Pochinok, Natalia – Doctor of Economics, professor, rector of the Russian State Social University
Yakimenko, Vasily – public figure and politician, businessman, founder and permanent leader of the youth movement «Moving Together».

See also
Education in Russia
List of universities in Russia

References

External links
Russian State Social University Website

 
1991 establishments in Russia
Educational institutions established in 1991
Public universities and colleges in Russia